Karl-Erik Nilsson (born 6 May 1957) is the president of the Swedish Football Association, a post he has held since 23 March 2012. Nilsson is also a retired football referee.

Life

Early career
Nilsson was born on 6 May 1957 in Emmaboda, Sweden. He studied to become an elementary school teacher, a profession he practised during the 1970s. Nilsson also worked in the correctional system of Sweden. As a politician for the Social Democratic Party, Nilsson was the chairman of the municipal board of Emmaboda Municipality between 1994 and 2006.

Referee
In the 1980s Nilsson started his career as a professional football referee. Nilsson supervised his first Allsvenskan match in 1992 and became a FIFA certified referee in 1994. He is best known for supervising matches during the UEFA Champions League (1999–2002). He was also a regular choice for leading international matches in the 1990s, for instance at the 1997 FIFA World Youth Championship. Nilsson's other official competitions included qualifiers for Euro 1996, Euro 2000, and the 1998 and 2002 World Cups. He also worked as a fourth official during UEFA Euro 1996.

The Swedish Football Association
After his career as a referee Nilsson remained in football and served as the chairman of Bohusläns Fotbollförbund until 2012. Nilsson was also active as a member of the boards of directors at the Swedish Football Association before he was elected president of the association on 23 March 2012 after Lars-Åke Lagrell resigned.

References

External links
 Profile on welfussball.de

1957 births
Living people
Swedish football referees
Chairmen of the Swedish Football Association